This is a list of lists of horror films. Often there may be considerable overlap particularly between horror and other genres (including action, thriller, and science fiction films).

By decade
List of horror films of the 1890s
List of horror films of the 1900s
List of horror films of the 1910s
List of horror films of the 1920s
List of horror films of the 1930s
List of horror films of the 1940s
List of horror films of the 1950s
List of horror films of the 1960s
List of horror films of the 1970s
List of horror films of the 1980s
List of horror films of the 1990s
List of horror films of the 2000s
List of horror films of the 2010s
List of horror films of the 2020s

By setting
List of horror films set in academic institutions
List of holiday horror films

By subgenre
List of eco-horror films
List of comedy horror films
List of science fiction horror films

By creature
List of ghost films
List of vampire films
List of zombie films
List of monster movies
List of giant monster films
List of kaiju films

Other
 List of highest-grossing horror films
 List of World War II horror films

See also
List of horror anthology films
Lists of horror film characters
List of mystery films
List of thriller films
List of films considered the worst
Vampire movies
Werewolf films
Zombie films

 

Lists of films by genre